Anil Kumar Shastri is an Indian politician and a senior leader of the Indian National Congress. He is known for his outspoken views. Presently, he is Chairman of the Hindi Department in All India Congress Committee. He was elected to the ninth Lok Sabha from Varanasi in 1989 as member of Janata Dal and was a Minister in the Ministry of Finance, Govt. of India.

Early life
Anil Shastri was born in Lucknow to Lal Bahadur Shastri, a former Prime Minister of India and Lalita Shastri. He is an alumnus of St. Columba's School, Delhi and St. Stephen’s College, Delhi. He completed his Advanced Management Programme at Ashridge Business School, now part of Hult International Business School.

Career

Social and educational activities
He has been instrumental in promoting higher education particularly in the field of management. He has set up three institutions and is the Chairman of Lal Bahadur Shastri Institute of Management, Delhi, Lal Bahadur Shastri Institute of Management & Technology, Bareilly, Lal Bahadur Shastri Institute of Technology & Management, Indore and Lal Bahadur Shastri polytechnic, Manda, Allahabad. Anil Shastri is Holding Trustee of Lal Bahadur Shastri National Memorial Trust which is involved with various socio-cultural activities. Anil Shastri also worked with a leading TATA Company, Voltas for seventeen years in senior positions.

His son Adarsh Shastri has worked in the corporate world for 17 years in senior positions who quit his job with Apple and joined the Aam Aadmi Party. He unsuccessfully contested the 2014 Lok Sabha elections from Allahabad, UP constituency and then won Feb. 2015 Delhi Assembly elections from Dwarka Constituency of Delhi.

Positions held
 Member of Parliament (for Janata Dal), ninth Lok Sabha, Varanasi, 1989
 Minister in the Ministry of Finance, Govt. of India

Publications
 Pavan Choudary and Anil Shastri. Lal Bahadur Shastri: Lessons in Leadership. Wisdom Village Publications, 2014. .

References

Children of prime ministers of India
India MPs 1989–1991
Living people
St. Stephen's College, Delhi alumni
St. Columba's School, Delhi alumni
Hult International Business School alumni
Lok Sabha members from Uttar Pradesh
Politicians from Lucknow
Indian National Congress politicians from Uttar Pradesh
Janata Dal politicians
Politicians from Varanasi
Year of birth missing (living people)